3700 series may refer to:

Train types
 Keisei 3700 series electric multiple unit
 Meitetsu 3700 series electric multiple unit